Long Eaton Cricket Club, established in 1972, is an amateur cricket club based in West Park, Derbyshire, England. The Club is the product of a town which has a proud history of cricket dating back to the early 19th century.

Ground
The club has been based on West Park since 1972. The current pavilion, built in 1992, replaced the old Vida Cricket Club pavilion,  with some funds from the club, local fundraising activities, donations from the Sports Council, and the Foundation for Sport and the Arts. The Club has access to potentially three pitches, the main one is situated in front of the pavilion - between the park bandstand and the bowling green.

History
History of cricket in Long Eaton dates back to the early nineteenth century. The earliest known reference to a match by a Long Eaton team was recorded in the Nottingham Mercury, dated 5 July 1844. The history of cricket in Long Eaton is very complicated. Many new teams sprang up from the new growing lace-making town in the 19th century, often using 'Long Eaton' in the team name. However, over time, through club mergers and player migration, these clubs along with their histories would ultimately filter down into the club that we know today. For a full history of Long Eaton's cricketing past, read Keith Breakwell's book "The History of Cricket in Long Eaton, Sandiacre & Sawley".

The Club currently has 3 senior teams competing in the South Nottinghamshire Cricket League, two Sunday league teams in the Newark Club Cricket Alliance league and a long established and very successful junior training section that play competitive cricket in the Erewash Young Cricketers League.

Club Performance
The South Nottinghamshire Cricket League competition results showing the club's position (by Division) since 2005.
 

 

 

The Newark Club Cricket Alliance Sunday League competition results showing the club's position (by Division) since 2008.

Club Honours

See also
Club cricket

References

Further reading
 Breakwell, Keith. 1994 "The History of Cricket in Long Eaton, Sandiacre & Sawley" 978-0-9521-4371-0

External links
 The Club Play-Cricket website
 G&M South Nottinghamshire Cricket League Official Play-Cricket website
 Newark Club Cricket Alliance Official Play-Cricket website
 Erewash Young Cricketers League Official Play-Cricket website

English club cricket teams
Cricket in Derbyshire
1972 establishments in England
Club cricket
Long Eaton